Jorge Lozano and Todd Witsken were the defending champions but did not compete that year.

Rick Leach and Jim Pugh won in the final 6–4, 6–2 against Jim Courier and Pete Sampras.

Seeds
Champion seeds are indicated in bold text while text in italics indicates the round in which those seeds were eliminated. The top four seeded teams received byes into the second round.

Draw

Final

Top half

Bottom half

External links
 1989 Eagle Tournament of Champions Doubles Draw

1989 Doubles
1989 Grand Prix (tennis)